Gypsochares catharotes is a moth of the family Pterophoridae that is known from South Africa, India (Khasi Hills, Cherrapunji, Sikkim, Kumaon, Bhim Tal and Muktesar) and possibly Pakistan.

References

Oidaematophorini
Moths described in 1907
Moths of Asia
Moths of Africa